George Smith or Smyth was an English lawyer.

Biography
The son of John Smith, of Kirdford, Sussex, he matriculated at Trinity College, Oxford on 29 January 1619, age sixteen. In 1633 he was a barrister-at-law of Gray's Inn. He was appointed a commissioner for the administration of justice in civil matters for Scotland in 1652, and sat in the Protectorate Parliament for the sheriffdom of Midlothian from 1654 to 1655, and for the sheriffdom of Dumfries from 1656 until his death on circuit at Inverness, on 26 September 1658.

References

1600s births
1658 deaths
People from Kirdford
Alumni of Trinity College, Oxford
Members of Gray's Inn
English MPs 1654–1655
English MPs 1656–1658
Politics of Midlothian
Politics of Dumfries and Galloway
17th-century Scottish judges